Mastigoteuthis magna is a species of whip-lash squid, characterised by a lack of photophores. The skin is heavily pigmented a deep red by a numerous chromatophores.

References
Joubin, L. 1920. Céphalopodes provenant des Campagnes de la Princesse Alice (1898-1910). 3e Serie. Monaco.

External links

Tree of Life web project: Mastigoteuthis magna

Mastigoteuthis
Molluscs described in 1913